Time Stays, We Go is the fourth studio album by London-based band The Veils. It was released by Pitch Beast Records on 26 April 2013.

Track listing

Personnel 
Credits adapted from liner notes.

 Finn Andrews – vocals, guitar, piano
 Sophia Burn – bass guitar
 Henning Dietz – drums
 Dan Raishbrook – guitar
 Uberto Rapisardi – guitar (8)
 Chelsea Jade – backing vocals (8, 9)
 Matt Appleton – trumpet
 Tony Beliveau – hammond organ
 Iron John – handclaps

Charts

References

External links 
 

2013 albums
Gothic country albums
Post-punk albums by English artists
The Veils albums
Rough Trade Records albums